Mosque of Atban Bin Malik is one of the historic mosques in Medina, Saudi Arabia. It is located 60 meters north of Al Jum'ah Mosque.

History 
The father of Atban Bin Malik, Malik bin Ijlan, belonged to the tribe of Bani Salim and was among the leaders of the Ansar. Atban asked the Islamic prophet Muhammad to come to his house and pray in one of the rooms, which then would be turned into a prayer room. Muhammad promised him, and he went with Abu Bakr to pray in one of corners in his house where Atban designated. Atban followed the prophet and made a row behind him for prayer, and they prayed two Ayahs. That was where they built the mosque later, and it was named after Atban. Since then the mosque was restored.

See also

 List of mosques in Saudi Arabia
  Lists of mosques 
 List of mosques in Medina

References 

Mosques in Medina